Robert John Odenkirk (born October 22, 1962) is an American actor, comedian and filmmaker best known for his role as Saul Goodman on Breaking Bad (2008–2013) and its spin-off Better Call Saul (2015–2022). For the latter, he has received five nominations for Primetime Emmy Award for Outstanding Lead Actor in a Drama Series. As a producer on Better Call Saul since its premiere, he has also received six nominations for Primetime Emmy Award for Outstanding Drama Series. He is also known for the HBO sketch comedy series Mr. Show with Bob and David (1995–1998), which he co-created and co-starred in with fellow comic David Cross. In 2015, he and Cross reunited, along with the rest of the Mr. Show cast, for W/ Bob & David on Netflix.

Odenkirk wrote for television series Saturday Night Live (1987–1991) and The Ben Stiller Show (1992), winning Emmy Award for Outstanding Writing for a Variety Series in 1989 and 1993. He also wrote for Late Night with Conan O'Brien (1993–1994) and acted in a recurring role as Agent Stevie Grant in The Larry Sanders Show (1993–1998). In the early 2000s, Odenkirk discovered the comedy duo Tim & Eric. He produced their television series Tom Goes to the Mayor (2004–2006) and Tim and Eric Awesome Show, Great Job! (2007–2010). His feature directorial credits include the films Melvin Goes to Dinner (2003), Let's Go to Prison (2006), and The Brothers Solomon (2007).

The success of Breaking Bad and Better Call Saul led to acting work in high-profile projects such as Nebraska (2013), the first season of Fargo (2014), Steven Spielberg's The Post (2017),  Pixar's Incredibles 2 (2018), Little Women (2019) and, as the lead, the action film Nobody (2021), which he also produced.

Early life
Odenkirk was born in Berwyn, Illinois, then raised in Naperville. He is the second oldest of seven siblings born to Walter Henry Odenkirk, who was employed in the printing business, and Barbara Mary ( Baier) Odenkirk (1936–2021), Catholics of German and Irish descent. His parents divorced in part due to Walter's alcoholism, which influenced Bob's decision to avoid alcohol as much as possible. He describes his father as "remote, fucked-up, and not around". Odenkirk would later say that he grew up "hating" Naperville as a 15-year-old because "it felt like a dead end, like Nowheresville. I couldn't wait to move into a city and be around people who were doing exciting things." Walter Odenkirk died of bone cancer in 1986. Odenkirk's younger brother is comedy writer Bill Odenkirk. Bob had helped with Bill's early career.

Odenkirk attended Naperville North High School and graduated at 16; he was "tired of high school", and because he had enough credits, he was able to leave high school when he was still a junior. Because he was so young and thought he would be awkward at any college, he decided to attend the local College of DuPage in Glen Ellyn, Illinois. After a year, he went to Marquette University in Milwaukee, Wisconsin, then transferred to Southern Illinois University in Carbondale, Illinois, "honing his sketch-writing and performance skills with live shows on both colleges' radio stations". He began his foray into comedy writing as a radio DJ for WIDB, the local non-broadcast college station at SIU. At WIDB he created a late-night (midnight to 4 am) radio comedy show called The Prime Time Special. After three years of college, Odenkirk was three credits short of graduating when he decided to try writing and improv in Chicago. He completed the credits at Columbia College Chicago and received his bachelor's degree from SIU in 1984. First studying with Del Close, Odenkirk attended the Players Workshop where he met Robert Smigel, and they began a collaboration that would last for years and take Odenkirk to Saturday Night Live. He also performed at the Improv Olympic alongside notable comedians Chris Farley and Tim Meadows.

Odenkirk would sharpen his stand-up and improv skills at Elmhurst's now defunct Who's on First comedy club, then part of The Steve and Leo Show.
 
Odenkirk visited Chicago's Second City Theater at the age of fourteen. He said his strongest comedic influence was Monty Python's Flying Circus, primarily due to its combination of cerebral humor and verbal slapstick, which Odenkirk characterized as "laugh-out-loud" humor. Other influences included radio personality Steve Dahl, SCTV, Steve Martin's Let's Get Small, Woody Allen, The Credibility Gap, and Bob and Ray.

Career

1980s–1990s: Saturday Night Live, writing and Mr. Show
Odenkirk was hired as a writer at Saturday Night Live in 1987 and worked there through 1991. Working alongside Robert Smigel and Conan O'Brien, he contributed to many sketches they created but felt uncertain of the efficacy of his writing at the show. When SNL took its 1988 summer break, Odenkirk returned to Chicago to perform a stage show with Smigel and O'Brien, titled Happy Happy Good Show. The following summer he did a one-man show, Show-Acting Guy, directed by Tom Gianas. During his final summer hiatus, he wrote and acted in the Second City Mainstage show, Flag Burning Permitted in Lobby Only. In that particular show, he wrote the character "Matt Foley, Motivational Speaker", for Chris Farley, which would later be reprised on SNL.

He acted in several small roles on the show, most visibly during a 1990 parody commercial for Bad Idea Jeans. During his final year at SNL, he worked alongside Adam Sandler, David Spade, Chris Rock and Chris Farley, but eventually he decided to leave the show in order to pursue performing. He has credited SNL with teaching him many lessons about sketch writing, from senior writers like Jim Downey and Al Franken, as well as his friends Smigel and O'Brien. In 1991, Odenkirk relocated to Los Angeles and was hired to write for the TV show Get a Life, which starred Late Night with David Letterman alumnus Chris Elliott. He wrote for The Dennis Miller Show.

Odenkirk's friendship with Ben Stiller, with whom he briefly shared an office at SNL, would lead to his being hired for the cast of The Ben Stiller Show in 1992. Working as both a writer and actor on the show, he created and starred in the memorable sketch "Manson Lassie", and helped the show win an Emmy Award for writing. However, the show had already been canceled by the time it won the award. Odenkirk served as a writer on Late Night with Conan O'Brien for the show's 1993 and 1994 seasons. Odenkirk met David Cross at Ben Stiller; shortly afterward, the pair began performing live sketch shows, which eventually evolved into Mr. Show with Bob and David. In 1993, Odenkirk began a recurring role on The Larry Sanders Show as Larry Sanders' agent, Stevie Grant. He would continue the character through 1998. Also in 1993, he had brief acting roles on Roseanne and Tom Arnold's The Jackie Thomas Show. Odenkirk's first movie roles were very minor parts in films such as Wayne's World 2, The Cable Guy, Can't Stop Dancing and Monkeybone. Odenkirk briefly attempted a stand-up career in the mid 90s, but ditched it soon after, admitting he "hated telling the same joke twice."

Created by Odenkirk and David Cross, Mr. Show ran on HBO for four seasons. The series featured a number of comedians in the early stages of their careers, including Sarah Silverman, Paul F. Tompkins, Jack Black, Tom Kenny, Mary Lynn Rajskub, Brian Posehn and Scott Aukerman. While nominated for multiple Emmy awards in writing and generally well-liked by critics, it never broke out of a "cult" audience into larger mainstream acceptance due to being a premium cable show. After Mr. Show, Bob and David and the writers from the staff wrote the movie Run, Ronnie, Run. The film was an extension of a sketch from the show's first season. However, the studio took production control away from Cross and Odenkirk during the editing stages, and the pair disowned the final product.

Early 2000s: After Mr. Show

Odenkirk starred in numerous television shows and some films. He has written and produced many TV pilots, including The Big Wide World of Carl Laemke and David's Situation, but none have made it to air or been picked up as a series. In 2003, Odenkirk directed Melvin Goes to Dinner and played the role of Keith. The film received positive reviews from critics and won the Audience Award at the SXSW Film and Music Festival. It was later self-released in five cities, then distributed on DVD by Sundance. 

In 2004, Odenkirk received an unsolicited package including the work of Tim Heidecker and Eric Wareheim. Inspired by their unique voice, he connected with them and helped them develop a semi-animated show for Adult Swim called Tom Goes to the Mayor. He assisted Tim and Eric with the development of their second series, Tim and Eric Awesome Show, Great Job. He had several small featuring roles on TV shows, including Everybody Loves Raymond, Dr. Katz, Professional Therapist, NewsRadio, Just Shoot Me!, Joey, Curb Your Enthusiasm, Arrested Development, Entourage, Weeds, and How I Met Your Mother.

Odenkirk was considered for the role of Michael Scott in the pilot of The Office, a role that ultimately went to Steve Carell. Odenkirk finally guested in the final season of The Office as a Philadelphia manager strongly reminiscent of Michael Scott. In 2006, Odenkirk directed Let's Go to Prison, which was written by Thomas Lennon and Robert Ben Garant, and starred Will Arnett, Dax Shepard and Chi McBride. The film received a 12% "All Critics" score from the website Rotten Tomatoes and had a total box office gross of a little more than US$4.6 million. The following year Odenkirk directed The Brothers Solomon, written by Will Forte and starring Forte, Will Arnett and Kristen Wiig. The film received a 15% "All Critics" score from Rotten Tomatoes and had a total box office gross of approximately $1 million.

2009–2014: Breaking Bad

In 2009, Odenkirk joined the cast of AMC's Breaking Bad as corrupt lawyer Saul Goodman. Writer Peter Gould, as well as several others, had been quickly drawn to Odenkirk for this role based on his Mr. Show performances. The Goodman role was only intended to cover a three-episode guest spot in the second season, but Odenkirk's performance led Gould and Vince Gilligan to extend the character as an ongoing role. Odenkirk became a series regular as Goodman for the show's third through fifth and final season.

In 2011, Odenkirk wrote and developed Let's Do This! for Adult Swim, starring Cal Mackenzie-Goldberg a "two-bit movie mogul and head of Cal-Gold Pictures as he leads a collection of crazy, fame-hungry strivers chasing Hollywood dreams". The pilot can be seen on Adult Swim's website. Odenkirk executive produced the sketch comedy show The Birthday Boys, which starred the comedy group of the same name. Odenkirk also appeared in and directed a number of the sketches on the show. It premiered on IFC on October 18, 2013. In 2014, Odenkirk played Police Chief Bill Oswalt in FX's miniseries Fargo. In fall of 2014, Odenkirk played Dr. Stork, a podiatrist who specializes in cutting off people's toes, in Adult Swim's anthology series Tim & Eric's Bedtime Stories.

After starring in Breaking Bad, Odenkirk began to have more prominent roles in critically successful films, such as Incredibles 2, Little Women, The Post, The Disaster Artist, The Spectacular Now, which received the Special Jury Award for Acting at the 2013 Sundance Film Festival, and the Alexander Payne-directed Nebraska, which was nominated for a Palme d'Or at the 2013 Cannes Film Festival.

2015–2022: Better Call Saul and film work

It was reported in April 2015 that Odenkirk was teaming with former co-star David Cross to produce a new sketch comedy series based on their previous production, Mr. Show, called W/ Bob and David. The series was commissioned by Netflix with the first season having been released in November 2015, featuring four 30-minute-long episodes, along with an hour-long behind-the-scenes special. Odenkirk and Cross both write, star in, and produce the show. Odenkirk has expressed interest in doing more seasons.

Odenkirk starred in the title role of Better Call Saul, a Breaking Bad spinoff. Primarily set in the early 2000s, years before the character's debut in Breaking Bad, the series follows lawyer Saul Goodman's journey from court-appointed defense attorney origins to his eventual status as a successful, though unscrupulous, criminal defense lawyer. He is also credited as a producer for the series.

The first season consists of ten 47-minute-long episodes, with a second and third season of ten episodes apiece following in early 2016 and 2017, respectively. The fourth season was available on Netflix as of August 6, 2018, and the fifth season premiered on AMC on February 23, 2020. The show's final sixth season, which started production in February 2020 but was delayed due to COVID-19, started airing on April 18, 2022.

Odenkirk co-wrote, produced, and starred in Girlfriend's Day, a Netflix original film. This film-noir comedy about a greeting card writer was directed by Michael Stephenson and influenced by Chinatown. It was a movie Odenkirk had wanted to make for 16 years, after Mr. Show writer Eric Hoffman sent him the original script and they began developing it. In April 2020, with the end of Better Call Saul in sight, Odenkirk established his own production company Cal-Gold Pictures and signed a first-look deal with Sony Pictures Television. Odenkirk, with Cal-Gold, plans to develop unique stories, with dynamic characters and social relevance. Former Comedy Central vice president Ian Friedman will serve as Cal-Gold's head of television. In March 2021, Odenkirk starred as Hutch Mansell in the action-thriller film Nobody, which opened at number one at the US box office, with $6.7 million in ticket sales.

Odenkirk received his star on the Hollywood Walk of Fame on April 18, 2022, the date of the premiere of the final season of Better Call Saul. Odenkirk's star is located next to the star of his Breaking Bad co-star Bryan Cranston.

Upcoming projects 
In 2022, a new series starring Odenkirk was announced for AMC, entitled Lucky Hank, based on the novel Straight Man by Richard Russo. It is planned to air in 2023. Odenkirk starred as Tommy Wiseau's character Johnny in a 2023 remake of The Room, which is in post-production.

Personal life
In the early 1990s, Odenkirk was linked romantically to fellow comedian, actress, and writer Janeane Garofalo, who introduced him to Mr. Show with Bob and David co-creator David Cross. In 1997, Odenkirk married Naomi Yomtov, who was later the executive producer of W/ Bob and David. They have two children.

Discussing costume choices on Better Call Saul, Odenkirk stated he has a bit of color blindness, and leaves it to the costume department to select the right outfits for his roles.

On December 15, 2019, Odenkirk's alma mater SIU announced it had awarded him the honorary degree of Doctor of Performing Arts.

On July 27, 2021, Odenkirk was hospitalized in Albuquerque after having what he described as a "small heart attack" on the set of the sixth season of Better Call Saul. Three days later, on July 30, Odenkirk reported that he would "be back soon", and on September 8 he reported he had returned to work. In 2022, Odenkirk revealed that he had two stents placed in his coronary arteries shortly after the widow-maker heart attack due to arterial plaque build-up, which he had been diagnosed with earlier in 2018; he also said that his condition was more severe than had initially been understood, disclosing that his heart stopped and he required cardiopulmonary resuscitation and defibrillation to recover a pulse.

Filmography

Bibliography

Awards and nominations

References

Further reading

External links

1962 births
20th-century American comedians
21st-century American comedians
20th-century American male actors
21st-century American male actors
American male comedians
American male film actors
American male television actors
American male voice actors
American music video directors
American people of Dutch descent
American people of German descent
American people of Irish descent
American sketch comedians
American television writers
Comedians from Illinois
Comedy film directors
Living people
Male actors from Illinois
American male television writers
Primetime Emmy Award winners
Screenwriters from Illinois
Southern Illinois University Carbondale alumni
Writers from Naperville, Illinois